Paul Wedgwood (born June 1970) is one of three founders of video game developer Splash Damage and was the CEO of the company until end of 2018.

Career
Paul Wedgwood was born in June 1970. Wedgwood started his career in the early 1990s as a network engineer attending major clients such as the Home Office and 10 Downing Street. However he first joined the games industry in 1999 when he became infrastructure manager for BarrysWorld a multiplayer gaming website and ISP. During this time he spent much of his time working as a presenter and commentator on an videogame TV show broadcasting to Australasia, called Lock 'n Load.

Alongside Barrysworld, Wedgwood worked as part of an amateur development team under his online alias 'Locki' on a modification of the game Quake III Arena entitled Q3F. A number of these core members later went on to form the video game developer Splash Damage in May 2001.

Since founding Splash Damage, Wedgwood has been credited on a number of games including Wolfenstein: Enemy Territory, Doom 3, Quake Wars and Brink.

In July 2016, the sale of British games developer Splash Damage to Leyou was announced, for up to $150 million by Wedgwood, its sole owner, co-founder and chief executive.

By then end of 2018, he officially stepped down as CEO of Splash Damage. Richard Jolly was appointed as the new CEO. Subsequently, Wedgwood and other former Splash Damage members formed Supernova Capital in 2018, an investment firm. Supernova made its first acquisition in March 2019 with the studio Flying Wild Hog.

References

1970 births
Video game developers
Living people